Gatesgarth is a settlement in Lake District of England. It is situated to the east of the lake of Buttermere, on the B5289 road on its western approach to the Honister Pass.

For administrative purposes, Gatesgarth lies within the civil parish of Buttermere, the district of Allerdale, and the county of Cumbria. It is within the Workington constituency of the United Kingdom Parliament. Prior to Brexit in 2020 it was part of the North West England constituency of the European Parliament.

References 

Villages in Cumbria
Buttermere, Cumbria (village)